Alfie is a 1966 album by jazz saxophonist Sonny Rollins of music composed for the 1966 British film of the same name.

It features performances by Rollins, with Kenny Burrell, Jimmy Cleveland, J.J. Johnson and Roger Kellaway, arranged and conducted by Oliver Nelson. The original film was made in London, England and features Rollins with British musicians, including pianist Stan Tracey, who are not heard on this album.

The album reached #17 on the R&B Billboard chart.  In the UK, the album was originally released in 1966 under the title Sonny Plays Alfie on the HMV label (CLP 3529) before resurfacing in 1966 as Alfie on the jazz-based Impulse! label, as in the United States.

Track listing 
All compositions by Sonny Rollins.
 "Alfie's Theme" – 9:41
 "He's Younger Than You Are" – 5:09
 "Street Runner with Child" – 3:59
 "Transition Theme for Minor Blues or Little Malcolm Loves His Dad" – 5:49
 "On Impulse" – 4:28
 "Alfie's Theme Differently" – 3:44
 Recorded at Rudy Van Gelder Studio, Englewood Cliffs, NJ, January 26, 1966

Personnel 
 Oliver Nelson – arranger, conductor
 Sonny Rollins – composer, tenor saxophone
 J.J. Johnson – trombone (tracks 1 and 2)
 Jimmy Cleveland – trombone (tracks 3–6)
 Phil Woods – alto saxophone
 Bob Ashton – tenor saxophone
 Danny Bank – baritone saxophone
 Roger Kellaway – piano
 Kenny Burrell – guitar
 Walter Booker – bass
 Frankie Dunlop – drums

References 

1966 soundtrack albums
Albums arranged by Oliver Nelson
Albums conducted by Oliver Nelson
Albums recorded at Van Gelder Studio
Film soundtracks
Impulse! Records soundtracks
Sonny Rollins soundtracks
Albums produced by Bob Thiele